People with the surname Ryan who have held the rank of General include:

Charles Ryan (surgeon) (1853–1926), Australian Military Forces major general
Cornelius E. Ryan (1896–1972), U.S. Army major general
John Dale Ryan, USAF Chief of Staff
Kurt J. Ryan (fl. 1980s–2020s), U.S. Army major general
Michael A. Ryan (fl. 1980s–2000s), U.S. Army brigadier general
Michael E. Ryan, also USAF Chief of Staff, and son of John Dale Ryan
Michael P. Ryan (USMC) (1916–2005), U.S. Marine Corps major general
Patrick J. Ryan (chaplain) (1902–1975), U.S. Army major general
Thomas M. Ryan Jr. (born 1928), U.S. Air Force general
General Ryan, a fictional character in the graphic novel The Hills Have Eyes: The Beginning

See also
Attorney General Ryan (disambiguation)